Xerosecta is a genus of small, air-breathing land snails, terrestrial pulmonate gastropod mollusks in the subfamily Helicellinae of the family Geomitridae, the hairy snails and their allies.

Snails in this genus create and use love darts as part of their mating behavior.

Species

Species within the genus Xerosecta include:

 Xerosecta adolfi L. Pfeiffer, 1854)
 Xerosecta arigonis (A. Schmidt, 1853)
 Xerosecta brachyflagellata De Mattia & Mascia, 2014
 Xerosecta cespitum (Draparnaud, 1801)
 Xerosecta contermina (L. Pfeiffer, 1848)
 Xerosecta conspurcata 
 Xerosecta dohrni (Paulucci, 1882)
 Xerosecta explanata (O. F. Müller, 1774)
 Xerosecta giustii Manganelli & Favilli, 1996
 Xerosecta hillyeriana  
 Xerosecta introducta (A. Villa & G. B. Villa, 1841)
 Xerosecta leptocolpata (P.M. Pallary, 1923)  
 Xerosecta promissa (Westerlund, 1892)
 Xerosecta reboundiana (Bourguignat, 1863)
 Xerosecta sandaliotica De Mattia & Mascia, 2014
 Xerosecta terverii (Michaud, 1831)
 Xerosecta vaucheri 
 Xerosecta pharussica 
Synonyms
 Xerosecta orientalis Uvalieva & Sacharnova, 1995: synonym of Kalitinaia orientalis (Uvalieva & Sacharnova, 1995) (original combination)

References

 Kobelt, W. (1892). Literaturbericht. Nachrichtsblatt der Deutschen Malakozoologischen Gesellschaft, 24 (7/8): 149-152. Frankfurt am Main
 Bank, R. A. (2017). Classification of the Recent terrestrial Gastropoda of the World. Last update: July 16th, 2017

External links
 Species list at: 
 Taxonomy and a good shell image at: 
 Excellent info at: 
 Monterosato, T. A. di. (1892). Molluschi terrestri delle isole adiacenti alla Sicilia. Atti della Reale Accademia di Scienze, Lettere e Belle Arti di Palermo. 3rd Series, 2: 1-34

Geomitridae
Taxonomy articles created by Polbot